Peter Gill (born 14 December 1964) is an Australian former professional rugby league footballer who played in the 1980s and 1990s.

Playing career

Gill played for BRL club Brothers, NSWRL sides the St. George Dragons for four seasons between 1988-1991 and the Gold Coast Chargers.  In the Super League he played for the London Broncos between 1995 and 1999, and appeared in the 1999 Challenge Cup Final defeat against the Leeds Rhinos.

Accolades
He was awarded the player of the series in the 1988 Panasonic Cup while playing with the St. George Dragons and in 1996 he was named in the Super League Dream Team. In 1997 he was again named in the Super League Dream Team.

References

External links
NRL points
Rugby League Project stats
Dream partnership bid for Broncos job

1964 births
Living people
Australian rugby league players
Rugby league players from Brisbane
Past Brothers players
St. George Dragons players
London Broncos players
Gold Coast Chargers players
Rugby league five-eighths
Rugby league locks
Rugby league second-rows